The Bernese Alps in the wide meaning (in German Berner Alpen i.w.S., in French Alpes Bernoises D.l.s.l.) are a mountain range in the northwestern part of the Alps. They are located in Switzerland.

Geography 
The range concerns several Swiss cantons: Bern, Vaud, Valais, Lucerne, Uri, Nidwalden and Obwalden.

SOIUSA classification 
According to SOIUSA (International Standardized Mountain Subdivision of the Alps) the range is an Alpine section, classified in the following way:
 main part = Western Alps
 major sector = North Western Alps
 section = Bernese Alps i.t.w.m.
 code = I/B-12

Subdivision 
The range is divided into three subsections:

 Urner Alps (in German Urner Alpen) - SOIUSA code:I/B-12.I;
 Bernese Alps s.s. (in German Berner Alpen i.e.S.) - SOIUSA code:I/B-12.II;
 Vaud Alps - SOIUSA code:I/B-12.III.

Notable summits 

Some notable summits of the range are:

Notable passes

Some notable mountain passes of the range are:

References

Maps
 Swiss official cartography (Swiss Federal Office of Topography - Swisstopo); on-line version: map.geo.admin.ch

Mountain ranges of Switzerland
Mountain ranges of the Alps
Landforms of the canton of Bern
Landforms of the canton of Vaud
Landforms of Valais
Landforms of the canton of Lucerne
Landforms of the canton of Uri
Landforms of Nidwalden
Landforms of Obwalden